The Derek de Solla Price Memorial Award, or Price Medal, was conceived to honor Derek J. de Solla Price for his contributions to information science and for his crucial role in developing the field of scientometrics. The award was launched by Tibor Braun, founder  of the international journal Scientometrics, and is periodically awarded by the journal to scientists with outstanding contributions to the fields of quantitative studies of science. The awarding ceremony is part of the annual ISSI conference. The first medal was awarded to Eugene Garfield in 1984. The full list of winners can be found below.

External links 

 ISSI - Derek de Solla Price Memorial Medal

References 

Bibliometrics